West Union Township is one of thirty-one townships in Custer County, Nebraska, United States. The population was 73 at the 2020 census. A 2021 estimate placed the township's population at 72.

Notable people
Fred N. Cummings, U.S. Representative from Colorado

References

External links
City-Data.com

Townships in Custer County, Nebraska
Townships in Nebraska